Kevin John Brockmeier (born December 6, 1972) is an American writer of fantasy and literary fiction.

Life and career
Brockmeier was born in Hialeah, Florida and raised in Little Rock, Arkansas. He is a graduate of Parkview Arts and Science Magnet High School (1991) and Southwest Missouri State University (1995). He taught at the Iowa Writers' Workshop, where he received his MFA in 1997, and lives in Little Rock.

His short stories have been printed in numerous publications and he has published two collections of stories, two children's novels, and two fantasy novels. 

Brockmeier has won three O. Henry Prizes, the Chicago Tribune's Nelson Algren Award for Short Fiction, Italo Calvino Short Fiction Award, the Booker Worthen Literary Prize, and the Porter Fund Literary Prize.

Published works

Story collections
 Things That Fall from the Sky (New York City: Pantheon Books, 2002)
 The View From The Seventh Layer (New York: Pantheon Books, 2008)
 The Ghost Variations (Penguin Random House, 2021)

Novels
 The Truth About Celia (New York: Pantheon Books, 2003)
 The Brief History of the Dead (New York: Pantheon Books, 2006)
  The Illumination (New York: Pantheon Books, 2011)
 A Few Seconds of Radiant Filmstrip: A Memoir of Seventh Grade (New York: Pantheon Books, 2014)

For younger readers
 City of Names (Viking, 2002)
 Grooves: A Kind of Mystery (New York: Katherine Tegen Books, 2006)

Miscellaneous stories
 "The Brief History of the Dead" (published in The New Yorker September 8, 2003; used as the first chapter of the novel by the same name)
For more information on individual stories, see Things That Fall from the Sky

Anthologies as Editor
Real Unreal: Best American Fantasy 3, edited by Kevin Brockmeier (Portland, Underland Press, scheduled January 2010).
Featuring stories by: Stephen King, Peter S. Beagle, Laura Kasischke, Jeffrey Ford, Lisa Goldstein, Paul Tremblay, Will Clarke, Thomas Glave, John Kessel, Kellie Wells, Ryan Boudinot, Rebecca Makkai, Martin Cozza, Chris Gavaler, Deborah Scwartzand, Shawn Vestal, and Katie Williams.

Awards and honors
 O. Henry Award (2000 for the short story "These Hands" and 2002 for "The Ceiling")
 Nelson Algren Award
 Italo Calvino Short Fiction Award
 James Michener–Paul Engle Fellowship
 National Endowment for the Arts grant recipient

References

Further reading
 "About the Author" in The Brief History of the Dead. New York: Pantheon Books, 2006. .
 McMyne, Mary. "Turning Inward: A Conversation with Kevin Brockmeier", Del Sol Literary Dialogues, Web del Sol/Algonkian Workshops. (Retrieved October 11, 2006).
 Windling, Terry. "Featured Artist: Kevin Brockmeier and Kelly Link". Interstitial Arts, 2003. (Retrieved October 11, 2006).

External links
 "@illumination_bk". THE ILLUMINATION (Pantheon Books, 2/1/2011) on Twitter.
 "The Brief History of the Dead". Kevin Brockmeier site at Random House.
 "Kevin Brockmeier Interview". EarthGoat. April 3, 2006.
 "Turning Inward: A Conversation with Kevin Brockmeier". by Mary McMyne. Web del Sol/Algonkian Workshops.
 Interview with Kevin Brockmeier on KRUI'sThe Lit Show, 2/1/2011.

 "Surviving Middle School: A Memoir of Seventh Grade". Interview on Iowa Public Radio: Talk of Iowa, 9/14/15.

American children's writers
American fantasy writers
21st-century American novelists
Living people
Writers from Little Rock, Arkansas
Iowa Writers' Workshop alumni
Iowa Writers' Workshop faculty
1972 births
American male novelists
American male short story writers
21st-century American short story writers
21st-century American male writers
Novelists from Iowa
Weird fiction writers
O. Henry Award winners